Winton is the surname of:

Alan Winton (born 1958), Bishop of Thetford in the Church of England
Alexander Winton (1860–1932), Scottish-born US businessman, founder of the Winton Motor Carriage Company
Andrew Winton (born 1972), Australian musician
Dale Winton (1955–2018), British TV presenter
Doug Winton (1929–2006), Scottish footballer
Francis Winton (c. 1829–1908), printer, publisher and politician in Newfoundland (now part of Canada)
Gordon H. Winton, American politician
Henry David Winton (1793–1855), English-born printer and newspaper owner in Newfoundland, father of the above
Jane Winton (1905–1959), American actress, dancer, opera soprano, writer and painter
Jeneverah M. Winton (1837-1904), American poet, author
John Winton, pen name of British author John Pratt (1931–2001)
Nan Winton, British journalist and broadcaster, first female national newsreader on BBC television (1960–1961)
Nicholas Winton (1909–2015), British humanitarian, nicknamed the British Schindler
Sabine Winton (born 1965), Australian politician
Tim Winton (born 1960), Australian author